Mæl Station (Mæl stasjon)  is a railroad station located at Tinn in Telemark, Norway. It is the terminus of the Rjukan Line (Rjukanbanen) running through Vestfjorddalen between Mæl and Rjukan. The station is located 16 km from Rjukan and on the mouth of the river Måna in Vestfjorddalen where the river runs into Lake Tinn. This was the point where the railway cars on the line were transferred to the Tinnsjø railway ferry  for transport to the Tinnoset Line.

History

Mæl Station was constructed based upon designs by architect, Thorvald Astrup. The station was built in 1909 when the Rjukan Line opened and was electrified in 1911. A new station building was constructed in 1917; it was named Rollag until 1921 when it had to change name because of the connection to the national railway network—there was already  Rollag Station on the Numedal Line.

After traffic on the Rjukan Line  declined, the railway was closed in 1991. It was kept as a heritage railway and the foundation Stiftelsen Rjukanbanen was established to ensure that the railway remained in an operational condition.  In  1993, Mæl Station was renovated and there is now an information center in the building. Mæl is a point of entry for boats which operate tours during the summer months. The former ferry boat DF  Ammonia is docked at  Mæl and is currently used as a  stationary museum.

See also
MF Storegut

References

Other sources

External links
 Norsk Jernbaneklubb entry

Railway stations on the Rjukan Line
Railway stations in Tinn
Railway stations opened in 1909
Railway stations closed in 1991
Disused railway stations in Norway
1909 establishments in Norway
1991 disestablishments in Norway